Meisam Rezapour (Persian: میثم رضاپور; born December 1, 1981 in Tehran) is an Iranian football player.

Club career
He began his career in 2003–04 under Ali Parvin's team, Azarbayejan, which was sold to Delvar Afzar Industrial Co. He joined Persepolis in 2004 and played one season at Persepolis. He played for Paykan from 2005 to 2011 before joining Padideh Shandiz.

Club Career Statistics
Last Update  10 May 2013 

 Assist Goals

External links
Persian League Profile

Iranian footballers
Persepolis F.C. players
Paykan F.C. players
Shahr Khodro F.C. players
Living people
1981 births
Association football midfielders